The 2014 BWF Super Series Finals was the final competition of the 2014 BWF Super Series. It was held from December 17 to December 21 in Dubai, United Arab Emirates.

Representatives by nation

§: Ko Sung Hyun from Korea was the only players who played in two categories (men's doubles and mixed doubles), while Zhao Yunlei from China, Christinna Pedersen from Denmark and Kim Ha-na from Korea were the players who played in two categories (women's doubles and mixed doubles).

Performance by nation

Men's singles

Seeds

Group A

Group B

Finals

Women's singles

Seeds

Withdrawn

Group A

Group B

Finals

Men's doubles

Seeds

Group A

Group B

Finals

Women's doubles

Seeds

Group A

Group B

Finals

Mixed doubles

Seeds

Withdrawn

Group A

Group B

Finals

References

Masters Finals
Sports competitions in Dubai
International sports competitions hosted by the United Arab Emirates
2014 in Emirati sport
BWF Super Series Finals
Badminton tournaments in the United Arab Emirates